Quentin Fottrell is an Irish columnist, author, agony uncle, journalist, social diarist and critic. He was the Irish correspondent for Dow Jones Newswires and The Wall Street Journal from 2003 to 2011, columnist and feature writer for The Irish Times and is currently working as a journalist in New York City. He was born in Dublin and studied psychology in University College Dublin (UCD) and journalism in University College Galway (UCG). 

Fottrell reported on the rise and fall  of the Celtic Tiger in Ireland and the expansion of the European Union during Ireland's six-month EU presidency. He currently serves as the personal finance editor for MarketWatch. He writes about spending and investing, and writes an advice column, The Moneyist, in which he answers questions on inheritance, marriage, divorce, relationships, weddings and other tricky money issues.

Fottrell has also contributed to magazines and newspapers in the U.S., U.K., and Ireland, including Town & Country, The Sunday Times, The Dubliner, wrote a weekly radio review column for The Irish Times and gave advice on relationships on The Ray D'Arcy Show. He has published a book on relationships in Ireland, titled "Love in a Damp Climate,"  and contributed to several others, including “A Pint and a Haircut,” a collection of true Irish stories. He is openly gay and an advocate of equality for LGBT people.

LGBT writer and activist 

As an activist for LGBT rights, Fottrell advocated for marriage equality in a series of columns for Irish newspapers in the run-up to the Irish civil partnership and marriage equality campaigns. In 2007, he wrote, "Gay marriage doesn't damage children. But not allowing it does. It fosters a culture of prejudice, and infects the aspirations of gay children. It's not healthy for our gay children to see a future in which their role in society is restricted." Fottrell also wrote about homophobia in rural Ireland and the struggles of gay people to live openly and free of prejudice in small towns.

Fottrell organized a "Vote Yes for Equality" campaign in New York in the weeks leading up to the marriage equality referendum in Ireland in May 2015. He subsequently reported on the impact of the referendum for The Wall Street Journal and interviewed Irish diaspora who returned to Ireland for the vote. After Ireland became the first country in the world to put this issue to a public vote, Fottrell wrote, "On May 22, Ireland sent a message to the world: If we can do it, you can too."

Since moving to New York, he has reported on the experiences of Irish emigrants and reflected, in particular, on how that relates to growing up gay in Catholic Ireland: "It's tempting to romanticize the past. Migrant memories, especially post-Celtic Tiger, can be selective and stylized like a TV commercial." He said generations of people left Ireland for cultural reasons as well as economic ones. "Leaving everything behind is not easy," he wrote, "but I needed to break new ground, and it would be an adventure: Where else to go but the land of Harvey Milk and money."

References

Living people
Alumni of University College Cork
Alumni of the University of Galway
Irish gay writers
Irish columnists
Irish non-fiction writers
Irish male non-fiction writers
Irish LGBT rights activists
Writers from Dublin (city)
Radio personalities from the Republic of Ireland
The Irish Times people
The Ray D'Arcy Show
Radio critics
1975 births